Elections to Limavady Borough Council were held on 17 May 1989 on the same day as the other Northern Irish local government elections. The election used three district electoral areas to elect a total of 15 councillors.

Election results

Note: "Votes" are the first preference votes.

Districts summary

|- class="unsortable" align="centre"
!rowspan=2 align="left"|Ward
! % 
!Cllrs
! % 
!Cllrs
! %
!Cllrs
! %
!Cllrs
! % 
!Cllrs
!rowspan=2|TotalCllrs
|- class="unsortable" align="center"
!colspan=2 bgcolor="" | UUP
!colspan=2 bgcolor="" | SDLP
!colspan=2 bgcolor="" | DUP
!colspan=2 bgcolor="" | Sinn Féin
!colspan=2 bgcolor="white"| Others
|-
|align="left"|Bellarena
|36.9
|2
|bgcolor="#99FF66"|51.5
|bgcolor="#99FF66"|3
|11.6
|0
|0.0
|0
|0.0
|0
|5
|-
|align="left"|Benbradagh
|bgcolor="40BFF5"|37.5
|bgcolor="40BFF5"|2
|31.7
|2
|0.0
|0
|30.8
|1
|0.0
|0
|5
|-
|align="left"|Limavady Town
|bgcolor="40BFF5"|45.0
|bgcolor="40BFF5"|3
|22.7
|1
|26.3
|1
|0.0
|0
|6.0
|0
|5
|-
|- class="unsortable" class="sortbottom" style="background:#C9C9C9"
|align="left"| Total
|39.9
|7
|36.6
|6
|11.8
|1
|9.6
|1
|2.1
|0
|15
|-
|}

District results

Bellarena

1985: 2 x SDLP, 2 x UUP, 1 x DUP
1989: 3 x SDLP, 2 x UUP
1985–1989 Change: SDLP gain from DUP

Benbradagh

1985: 2 x UUP, 2 x Sinn Féin, 1 x SDLP
1989: 2 x UUP, 2 x SDLP, 1 x Sinn Féin
1985–1989 Change: SDLP gain from Sinn Féin

Limavady Town

1985: 3 x UUP, 1 x SDLP, 1 x DUP
1989: 3 x UUP, 1 x SDLP, 1 x DUP
1985–1989 Change: No change

References

Limavady Borough Council elections
Limavady